Thakazhi is a 1998 Malayalam documentary film made by M. T. Vasudevan Nair on renowned Malayalam writer, Thakazhi Sivasankara Pillai (1912–1999). The 57-minute film was written, directed and narrated by Nair for Sahitya Akademi. The film's music was provided by Raveendran.

References

Documentary films about writers
Indian documentary films
1998 documentary films
1998 films
1990s Malayalam-language films
Films with screenplays by M. T. Vasudevan Nair
Films directed by M. T. Vasudevan Nair